Ramandolo is a sweet white Italian wine from the village of the same name which is situated in the hills near Nimis in the Friuli-Venezia Giulia wine region of northeast Italy. It is made from a local variety of the Verduzzo grape. Since 2001, Ramandolo has been produced as a DOCG wine. Prior to this it was a subzone of the Colli Orientali del Friuli DOC.

DOCG requirements 
Verduzzo grapes destined for DOCG wine production are limited to a harvest yield no greater than 10 tonnes/ha with the grapes allowed to hang on the vine late in the season and may even receive extra drying after picking. This allows for a greater concentration of sugar which leaves a wine with noticeable residual sweetness even with the high minimum alcohol level of 14% required.

Wine styles 
Wine expert Peter Saunders describes well made examples of Ramandolo from favorable vintages as fragrant, full-bodied, slightly tannic and not too sweet. Karen MacNeil describes Ramandolo as having a copper sheen to its deep yellow color with herbal notes.

References 

Italian wine
Italian DOCG